Princess Mariana Victoria can refer to:
 Infanta Mariana Victoria of Portugal (1768-1788), Portuguese princess
 Mariana Victoria of Spain (1718-1781), Spanish princess and later Queen of Portugal